The Society of Christian Ethics (SCE) is a non-denominational academic society that promote scholarly work in Christian ethics and the relation of Christian ethics to other ethics traditions. Its members are faculty and students at universities, colleges, and theological schools primarily in the United States, Canada, and Europe. 

Founded as the American Society of Christian Social Ethics in 1959, the society changed its name to the American Society of Christian Ethics in  before adopting its current name in 1980.

The SCE sponsors an annual meeting in conjunction with the Society of Jewish Ethics and the Society for the Study of Muslim Ethics. Some papers from these meetings are published in the Journal of the Society of Christian Ethics.

Its president as of October 2022 is Fr Bryan N. Massingale of Fordham University.

Presidents 

 1959: Henry Kolbe
 1960–1961: John C. Bennett
 1961: E. Clinton Gardner
 1962–1963: Paul Ramsey
 1963: Walter W. Sikes
 1964–1965: Prentiss L. Pemberton
 1965–1966: Paul Elmen
 1966: Victor Obenhaus
 1967: Murray Leiffer
 1968–1969: James Luther Adams
 1969–1970: James Gustafson
 1970–1971: John H. Satterwhite
 1971: Charles Curran
 1972–1973: Edward L. Long Jr.
 1973–1974: Charles C. West
 1974–1975: Roger L. Shinn
 1975–1976: Preston N. Williams
 1976–1977: J. Philip Wogaman
 1977: Waldo Beach
 1978: Walter G. Muelder
 1979: Donald W. Shriver Jr.
 1980–1981: Douglas Sturm
 1981–1982: 
 1982–1983: Beverly Wildung Harrison
 1983: Thomas Ogletree
 1984: Alan Geyer
 2003: June O'Connor
 2020: Jennifer A. Herdt
 2021: James F. Keenan, SJ
 2022: Bryan N. Massingale

Executive secretaries / Executive directors 

 1959–1963: Das Kelley Barnett
 1964–1967: E. Clinton Gardner
 1968–1971: Douglas Sturm
 1972–1975: Franklin Sherman
 1976–1979: Max L. Stackhouse
 1980–1983: Joseph L. Allen

References

Footnotes

Bibliography

External links 
 

Christian ethics
Ethics organizations
Learned societies of the United States
Christian organizations based in the United States
Theological societies